Many webcomics have been influenced by video games and video game culture.

Background
Webcomics frequently poke fun at video game logic, the video game industry, and stereotypical behavior of gamers. The earliest video game webcomic was Polymer City Chronicles, which started in 1995. However, 1998's PvP is seen as the origin of the genre, influencing various webcomics following it. Low-quality video game webcomics were particularly common in the mid-2000s, often featuring author stand-ins with poor dialogue and unrealistic relationships. A common trope in video game webcomics is to have the main characters sit on a couch, talking about the game they are playing.

It is common for webcomics to exclusively use in-game art and speech bubbles, such as in sprite comics. The term gamics has been proposed by Nathan Ciprick in 2004 to refer to webcomics that consist entirely of video game graphics. Despite the fact that video game graphics are generally copyrighted, owners of the intellectual properties used have traditionally been tolerant.

Webcomics set in a video game world

Webcomics about video games

Webcomics inspired by video games

Other

ShiftyLook, a former subsidiary of Namco Bandai, focused on reviving various Namco video game franchises between 2011 and 2014. The company originally did this through English language webcomics. ShiftyLook has released webcomics based on Dig Dug, Dragon Spirit, Klonoa, and various other video games.

See also
:Category:Video game webcomics
Sprite comic

References

 
Video games